Fredericton-Grand Lake is a provincial electoral district for the Legislative Assembly of New Brunswick, Canada.  It was first contested in the 2014 general election, having been created in the 2013 redistribution of electoral boundaries.

The district includes the northeastern part of the City of Fredericton (most of Marysville and all of Barkers Point), the communities surrounding Grand Lake, and points in between including Noonan and Maugerville.

Members of the Legislative Assembly

Election results

References

External links 
Website of the Legislative Assembly of New Brunswick
Map of riding as of 2018

New Brunswick provincial electoral districts
Politics of Fredericton